The 38th South American Junior Championships in Athletics (Campeonatos Sudamericanos de Atletismo de Juveniles) were held
in São Paulo, Brazil in the Estádio Ícaro de Castro Melo from July 25–26, 2009.  The Champions for
men’s 10,000m, both Race Walking and Combined Events were extracted from the
classification of the 2009 Pan American Junior Championships held in
Port of Spain, Trinidad and Tobago in the Hasely Crawford Stadium
from July 31 to August 2, 2009.  A detailed report on the results was
given.

Participation (unofficial)
Detailed result lists can be found on the "World Junior Athletics History"
website. An unofficial count yields the number of about 212
athletes from about 12 countries: Argentina (30), Bolivia (6), Brazil (75),
Chile (27), Colombia (21), Ecuador (10), Panama (6), Paraguay (2), Peru (10),
Suriname (2), Uruguay (3), Venezuela (20).

Medal summary
Medal winners are published.
Complete results can be found on the CBAt website, and on the "World Junior Athletics History"
website.

Men

Women

Medal table (unofficial)

The medal count was published.

Team trophies

The placing tables for team trophy(overall team, men and women categories) were published.

Total

Male

Female

References

External links
World Junior Athletics History

South American U20 Championships in Athletics
Athletics
South American U20
International sports competitions in São Paulo
International athletics competitions hosted by Brazil
2009 in youth sport